Lasiadenia is a genus of flowering plants belonging to the family Thymelaeaceae.

Its native range is Colombia to Guyana and Northern Brazil.

Species:

Lasiadenia ottohuberi 
Lasiadenia rupestris

References

Thymelaeaceae
Malvales genera